Oleg Yevgenievich Kovalenko (born February 11, 1975) is a Kazakhstani ice hockey player who is a defenceman and was part of the Kazakhstan men's national ice hockey team at the 2006 Winter Olympics. He last played for Kazzinc Torpedo-2 Ust Kamenogorsk in Kazakhstan's second highest hockey league (after the Kazakhstani Championship) Kazakhstan Vyschaya Liga in the 2010 year.

Career statistics

Regular season and playoffs

International

References

1975 births
Living people
Avangard Omsk players
Barys Nur-Sultan players
Erie Panthers players
Metallurg Novokuznetsk players
HC Neftekhimik Nizhnekamsk players
Kazzinc-Torpedo players
Olympic ice hockey players of Kazakhstan
Sportspeople from Oskemen
Ice hockey players at the 2006 Winter Olympics
Salavat Yulaev Ufa players
Soviet ice hockey defencemen
Asian Games gold medalists for Kazakhstan
Asian Games silver medalists for Kazakhstan
Medalists at the 1996 Asian Winter Games
Medalists at the 2003 Asian Winter Games
Medalists at the 2007 Asian Winter Games
Ice hockey players at the 1996 Asian Winter Games
Ice hockey players at the 2003 Asian Winter Games
Ice hockey players at the 2007 Asian Winter Games
Asian Games medalists in ice hockey
Kazakhstani expatriate sportspeople in the United States
Kazakhstani ice hockey defencemen
Expatriate ice hockey players in Canada
Kazakhstani expatriate ice hockey people
Kazakhstani expatriate sportspeople in Russia
Kazakhstani expatriate sportspeople in Canada
Expatriate ice hockey players in Russia